Papermill Reedbed is a 6 hectare nature reserve in Bramford in Suffolk. It is owned by Blakenham Farms and managed by the Suffolk Wildlife Trust.

The Trust has restored this area of dry grassland of low ecological value by installing water control measures to create wetland. Several species of dragonfly and damselfly have colonised the water-filled ditches, and they are used by water voles and otters.

The Gipping Valley river Path goes through the reserve.

References

Suffolk Wildlife Trust